is a fictional character in Arc System Works' Guilty Gear video game series. He first appeared in the 1998 video game Guilty Gear, as the main character and namesake. In the series, he is a bounty hunter who has dedicated his life to the destruction of Gears, a race of magical bioweapons that plunged the world into a hundred-year war known as the Crusades. He was once a member of the Sacred Order of the Holy Knights, and this appearance was featured in another playable character named .

Sol Badguy, whose real name is Frederick Bulsara, was named after Freddie Mercury's nickname, "Mr. Bad Guy", by Daisuke Ishiwatari, the series' creator, who also provided his voice in the video games. Despite being criticized as a generic fictional character, video game reviewers compared his relationship with his main rival, Ky Kiske, to that of other notable video game characters. Sol's fighting abilities and the choice of his name were also the subject of reviewers, receiving both praise and criticism.

Creation and design
Creator Daisuke Ishiwatari designed Sol in many ways as his alter ego, and also recorded Sol's in-game voice (the voice actor for Guilty Gear X2'''s story mode and drama CDs, however, is done by Hikaru Hanada). Ishiwatari's favorite band is Queen, and he put in Sol's profile that he is a fan of Queen, and named Sol Badguy, whose real name is Frederick (or Freddie for short), after Freddie Mercury, whose nickname was "Mr. Bad Guy".

Appearances
Introduced in the first installment of the series (1998), Frederick was one of the lead scientists of the Gear project, as well as being the prototypical Gear, dating from over a hundred years before the events of the Guilty Gear games. As a prototype, he is immune to the orders of Commander Gears. He was personally acquainted with Asuka R. Kreutz (typically known as That Man) prior to the Crusades. As Frederick, Sol created the "Outrage", which he called a supreme Anti-Gear weapon. The Outrage has eight components called "Jinki" (Godlike Weapons), which greatly amplify their wielders' magical ability. Later, he was himself recruited into the order, as a bounty hunter named Sol Badguy. Sol took part in the Crusades, during which he was a member of the Sacred Order of Holy Knights (Seikishidan), acquiring the nickname . The theft earned him Ky Kiske's enmity.

In 2175, Sol faced Justice directly. During the fight, which Justice won, she discovered that Sol was a Gear. Justice attempted to assert her power as a Commander Gear to control Sol, but was unable to do so. Exploiting her confusion and weakness from the fight, the Holy Order, led by Ky, sealed Justice away, bringing the war to an end. However, a Gear named Testament began a plan to free Justice, and to stop it, the Union of Nations held a tournament. The canon stated that Sol was the winner of the Tournament, which also resulted in Justice discovering that Sol was, in fact, Frederick. Justice, in her dying words, commented that she wished that "...the three of us..." could talk one last time, and Sol swore to kill Asuka.

In Guilty Gear X (2000), Sol has three endings, all of which involve a fight against Dizzy, who has a half-million dollar bounty on her head. However, he spares her life in all of them, losing against her in his second ending, and judging that she is not a threat to the world in the other two.

In the subsequent game, Guilty Gear X2 (2002), his story-line involved chasing down I-No. In his first ending, his defeat of I-No led to a direct confrontation with Asuka, who casually deflected all of Sol's attacks, saying that Sol was needed because soon a greater battle than the Crusades will occur. In Sol's second ending, Slayer informed him of the Post-War Administration Bureau's interest in Dizzy. In the third ending, he fought Dizzy, who had been possessed by Necro, after I-No knocked her off the Mayship, and sent Dizzy on her way to meet Johnny and May.

In Guilty Gear XX Accent Core Plus (2008), Sol had two endings. In one, I-No threw him back in time to fight his past self, Order-Sol. After both are weakened from the battle, I-No reappeared to murder Order-Sol, which, in turn, caused Sol's present form to cease existing. In his other ending, the same set of events played out, but Sol's present form, strangely, is unaffected by his past self's death. After escaping the time rift, Ky confronted and engaged him in battle. After the fight, Sol and Ky finally settled their differences and went their separate ways, with Ky asking Sol to promise that they will meet again. Though it was referenced in both Sol and Ky's endings, only Sol's told the events directly after the battle, which implied that Sol was the victor.

In Guilty Gear 2: Overture (2007), Sol Badguy took in a young man named Sin as his apprentice, and traveled the world with him as bounty hunters. During their journey, he met Izuna, who told him that a man called Vizel was seeking out and destroying Gears, by order of Valentine, and that his next target was the kingdom of Illyria. Sol, Sin, and Izuna go to Illyria and find Ky Kiske trapped with a binding spell. With Dr. Paradigm's help they were able to release him. Eventually, they captured Valentine, who transformed herself into a monster. Sol fought her, and after the fight, he found himself in a white space, unable to return. However, he was confronted by That Man, who confirmed that Valentine was a copy of Aria, Sol's former lover. Sol was returned to the real world, where he reunited with his allies.

In Guilty Gear Xrd -SIGN- (2014), Sol continued his journeys with Sin when Ramlethal Valentine declared war on humanity. Working alongside Ky, Sin, Leo Whitefang, and Elphelt Valentine, Sol fought to stop the Conclave from using the Cradle to resurrect Justice and destroy humanity. In the end, Sol and his allies were able to stop Justice from reviving, but Elphelt betrayed them and tried to kill them. She was eventually taken to the Backyard, and Sol, Sin and Ramlethal set out to find her.

In Xrd -REVELATOR- (2016), Sol was confronted by Raven, who told him that That Man needed his help in preventing Elphelt from merging with Justice. Before the final battle against Ariels, Sol attempted to claim he is not related to Dizzy, due to her mother being Justice, who was once Aria. His allies began to theorize his connection with the two female Gears, which caused Ky—Dizzy's husband—and Sol to scream out in horror at the supposed revelation that the two rivals are in-laws. After Ariels' defeat, Jack-O took Elphelt’s place and fused with Justice, becoming a reincarnated Aria, and Sol revealed to his allies That Man’s true identity—Asuka R. Kreutz.

In the epilogue storyline added in Xrd REV 2 (2017), Sol visited Ky's manor, where he challenged Ky to a duel. As Ky noticed Sol’s fighting intent, they took their discussion outside the manor to speak privately. While recalling their days as members of the Sacred Order of Holy Knights, Sol mocked Ky, claiming that he held back every time they fought, despite him not doing so when he battled Gears. He further remarked that Dizzy was a “monster”, just like himself, angering Ky, who then entered a frenzied rage and managed to overpower Sol in combat. As Sol lied in a newly-formed crater, Sol explained that he had a score to settle with Asuka, with Ky asking him about it. Unbeknownst to them, at the same time they spoke, Asuka turned himself in to the United States government.

Sol returns as a main protagonist in Guilty Gear -STRIVE- (2021). Despite becoming a legendary hero since the previous event, Sol remains a bounty hunter, now accompanied by a fully recovered Jack-O, and the nation often goes to Ky to message Sol for urgent matters. Having had taken a request from a weakened Ariels to stop I-No, Sol realizes that Happy Chaos, a demon-like sorcerer who possessed Ariels body and formerly Asuka's mentor known as The Original had been manipulating entire events alongside I-No herself. Sol's healing power as a Gear becomes slower, due to being shot by Chaos with the same material which created Nagoriyuki's katanas. He arrives at Washington as guest of the White House during a peace meeting with Asuka, where the Gear Maker is targeted by Chaos and I-No for the possession of the Tome of Origin. Sol’s story concludes as he lets Asuka remove the Flame of Corruption from him to restore his humanity. Despite the Flame of Corruption's removal being on a bad timing when Chaos fused with I-No into a godlike being, Sol manages to kill a godlike I-No, with the help of Ky, Axl, and a redeemed Nightless samurai Nagoriyuki. He also saves Jack-O from sacrificing herself to stop I-No, declaring his love for her as Jack-O, not as Aria. With I-No’s demise, Sol is officially declared dead by the U.S. government and is given a hero's burial. Now going by his original name, Frederick goes off the grid and opens a shop with Jack-O at the abandoned space station Iseo.

He was also a playable character in the spin-off games Guilty Gear Petit (2001), Isuka (2003), Dust Strikers (2006), and Judgment (2006). Along with Ky Kiske, Potemkin and Milia Rage, he is the only character to appear in every Guilty Gear game.

Order-Sol
Order-Sol is an alternative past version of the original character. Sol was once a part of the Sacred Order of the Holy Knights, and Order-Sol is a take on what Sol looked like and how he fought during that time. This form also shows a glimpse of Sol's true Gear form when performing one of his special moves.

He first appeared as a playable character in Guilty Gear XX Slash (2005), and subsequently appeared in Guilty Gear XX Accent Core (2006), Guilty Gear XX Accent Core Plus (2008), and Guilty Gear XX Accent Core Plus R (2012). In addition to being playable, Order-Sol also appeared as a final boss of Guilty Gear XX Slashs Arcade Mode.

Reception
In a 2013 poll conducted by Arc System Works, Sol was voted as the second most popular character from the series. Daisuke Ishiwatari cited Sol as his favorite character several times. William Usher from Cinema Blend found Sol to be one of his favorite characters "... of all time, for any game". He has been praised for his last name's loftiness by many sources, with Eurogamer calling him "... the best-named videogame character of all time." On the other hand, Hardcore Gaming 101 said "... his name is ridiculous", 1UP.com ranked him sixth in their "Top 10 Most Ridiculous Character Names", while Emily Gera of VideoGamer.com included him in a list of "Oddest Character Names in Games", and GamesRadar's David Houghton placed him among the "... 25 most gloriously stupid character names in video games".

Despite calling him one of the cast's "... more generic characters ...", IGN commented that Sol has a "... standard speed and versatility ...", and considered Sol "cool" because he is a good character to play with for newcomers, as he is "... one of the easier characters to get acquainted [sic] with." Thunderbolt Games listed his Dust Loop as one of "Fighting Games' Most Infamous Combos", and stated it is "... the biggest crowd upsetting combo in X2", as well as "... one of history's most boring and abused combos". On the other hand, GamesRadar's "Top 7" named him the fifth best character in fighting games of all time, adding, "Sol and his array of fiery attacks are emblematic ...", and calling Dust Loop, "... one of fighting games' most iconic combos". Similarly, he was ranked 34th in Complexs list of "Most Dominant Fighting Game Characters". In Game Informers 2009 list of the "Top Ten Best Fighting Game Characters", Sol placed sixth. The option of his alternate form, Order-Sol, was also praised by IGN that remarked he "... is utterly fantastic and makes a great addition to the cast". In contrast, Lucas Sullivan from GamesRadar described him as a "... bit like Evil Ryu: just'' different enough from the original to justify your inclusion in a limited roster".

His relation with Ky Kiske has also been commended by reviewers. Todd Ciolek from Anime News Network described it as a "true relationship", and IGN writer, Ryan Clements, called them a legendary pair, IGN's Vincent Ingenito said "Ky and Sol might very well have been the next Ryu and Ken ... or at least the next Scorpion and Sub-Zero". Writing for GameSpy, Benjamin Turner commented that they "... are the closest you'll get to a Ken and Ryu, but they look approximately a thousand times cooler." On the same subject, Clements, however, said their clashes were "... great melodrama".

References

Demon characters in video games
Cyborg characters in video games
Fictional American people in video games
Fictional bounty hunters
Fictional swordfighters in video games
Genetically engineered characters in video games
Guilty Gear characters
Fictional hunters in video games
Fictional inventors in video games
Fictional knights in video games
Male characters in video games
Fictional mercenaries in video games
Fictional scientists in video games
Time travelers
Video game characters introduced in 1998
Video game characters who can move at superhuman speeds
Video game characters with accelerated healing
Video game characters with superhuman strength
Video game characters with fire or heat abilities
Video game characters with slowed ageing
Video game mascots
Video game protagonists